The 1909 Auckland Rugby League season was the league's first ever official season. It celebrated its centenary in 2009. Four representative matches had been played in 1908 as players in Auckland attempted to showcase the new code to both Auckland residents and those elsewhere.

First meeting 
A meeting of players was held on Monday 12 July where it was decided to call for another meeting the following Monday and to invite all interested parties to attend. The ultimate aim was to form a league. It was also stated that "three clubs will be formed, two in the city and one at the North Shore". The meeting was duly held on 19 July at the Chamber of Commerce on Swanson Street. Mr. A.E. Glover, M.P., occupied the chair, and there was a large attendance of around 150 supporters and players. They were to affiliate with the Northern Union and hold a practice match on the following Saturday. "Mr. R. Eagleton offered the league the use of three suitable playing grounds in Epsom". The ground was located near Potters Paddock which was later converted into Alexandra Racecourse. Elections for officers were also held with 14 appointments made.

North Shore Albions formed 
A further meeting was held at North Shore on the Wednesday evening at the Council Chambers in Devonport with 40 in attendance, and a club was formed. It was noted that they had the playing numbers for two teams and they had "taken the pick of the amateur players of the district club". The club would be called North Shore Albions. On the Thursday night a preliminary meeting was held in the city with 20 players attending with the goal of forming a club that was either a city team or a combination of a city and Ponsonby team, while a Newton club was also aimed to be formed the following week as there was "considerable dissatisfaction among the members at the management of the Auckland Union". It was decided to play a match on the Saturday between the North Shore team and the city team. The match was duly played between North Shore and City and resulted in a win to the former by 44 points to 22.

Chairman of the league, D.W. McLean spoke with a representative of The New Zealand Herald and was reported as saying the following; "no payment would be made for playing, but the men when away from home would be recompensed for lost time. They would provide players with uniforms free in order that a team might take the field in a regulation costume, not in varied coloured pants and stockings, as is often seen even in rep. Rugby matches. Their meetings would be open to the press and full information will be given to the public of all moneys received and expended...". He "spoke enthusiastically of the possibilities of the new code, from which he contended the rougher elements of rugby had been removed, this providing a game which was full of bright play and sparkling situations. The liability of getting hurt had been greatly reduced by the removal of scrums and line-out play". It was also reported that several prominent players, questioned about why they had left the Rugby Union game said that "they were tired of the unequalness of the contests under the present system. There was no sport in being beaten by 61 points to nil as the North Shore seniors were recently by the Ponsonby team… the management of the Auckland Union was not mindful enough of the clubs’ or players interests".

Ponsonby United born 
At a meeting at Leys Institute on 30 July the Ponsonby club was formed. There were 50 supporters present with Mr. A Thompson chairing the meeting. Also in attendance were Mr James Carlaw, along with Arthur Carlaw, Charles Dunning, and Jack Stanaway. They called for another meeting to be held the following week to enroll players. They played a match against Newton Rangers on August 21 which they won by 16 points to 6.

Representative matches
Auckland played four representative matches, though the first match was still prior to the official formation of the league. They played the New Zealand Maori team, two matches against Taranaki, one against Wellington, and a further match against Rotorua which was a largely junior side. The match versus Wellington on 9 October drew 4,000 spectators and raised £122 for the Auckland Rugby League.

Auckland v NZ Maori
A match was played between Auckland and a New Zealand Māori team on 10 July which was preparing to depart for a tour of Australia. The Auckland team was victorious by 21 points to 14 in front of a crowd estimated at 3,000. Proceeds from the match were to go towards the formation and establishment of the league. Auckland City Council granted use of Victoria Park for the match to be played on Saturday, 10 July. The council allowed for an admission charge "not exceeding one shilling for each person… with an extra shilling for every horse or vehicle, and an additional charge not exceeding one shilling for each person for admission to the pavilion". The Maori team was preparing for a tour of Australia. They had been based in Te Kuiti with Barclay tutoring the side. He had been a member of the last 'native' team to tour Australia. The Auckland team was preparing hard under the guidance of William Mackrell.

Auckland v Taranaki
Taranaki tipped over the home team 8–7. On 31 July a trial match was played between A and B teams before William Wynyard selected the representative side to face Taranaki. It was an uninspiring encounter, won by the Possible selection 37–29. The match against Taranaki marked the first ‘official’ Auckland team as it was selected after a league had formed.

Auckland v Taranaki
On 12 September a trial match was played at Eagleton's Paddock in Epsom between A and B teams. The A team won by 22 points to 8 with tries for the A team to Arthur Carlaw 2, Fred Jackson, William Mackrell, George Seagar, and Winters, with D Bradburn kicking 2 conversions. While for the B team Smith and Frederick Neighbour scored tries, and Neighbour also kicked a conversion.
William Wynyard then selected the team to face Taranaki in New Plymouth and they fared better this time winning by 27 points to 11.

Auckland XIII v Rotorua
An Auckland XIII travelled to Rotorua to play the local side and was trounced by a much better team filled with Māori players who had represented them in Australia. The Auckland team was largely a junior side though it did feature several more experienced players such as Richard Wynyard, Frank Woodward and Frederick Neighbour. Unfortunately Ferguson broke his leg during the match and had to be taken to the local hospital. The Rotorua side featured Riki Papakura who a week later played for Auckland against Wellington.

Auckland v Wellington

Auckland representative matches played and scorers
The following list includes the four legitimate representative matches against New Zealand Maori, Taranaki (two matches), and Wellington. The Rotorua match is omitted as it was an Auckland Junior/Auckland XIII selection. James Grundy switched from the Ponsonby rugby club at the end of the season and made one appearance for Auckland. It appears that he did not play either code in the following season.

Exhibition matches

North Shore Albions v City Rovers

North Shore Albions v Combined Town

Ponsonby United v Newton Rangers

Ponsonby United v Newton Rangers
Jack Stanaway (Hone Haira) coached the sides. There was no scoring published for the match as it was considered a practice game. It was reported that F. Lynch, W. Tobin, and Matthews played well in the backs for Ponsonby, with B. Kean, Warner, and Oakley playing well in the forwards. In the Newton side B. Tobin, and Haswell in the backs, and Oliver, Cole, and Curtis were "conspicuous" in the forwards.

Newton Rangers v North Shore Albions

Junior matches

References

External links
 Auckland Rugby League Official Site

Auckland Rugby League seasons
Auckland Rugby League
Rugby league in Auckland